The Melbourne Indoor was a men's tennis tournament played in Melbourne, Australia, from 1980 through 1985.  The event was part of the Grand Prix tennis circuit and was played on indoor carpet courts.

Finals

Singles

Doubles

References
 ATP Tour archive

Defunct tennis tournaments in Australia
Carpet court tennis tournaments
Grand Prix tennis circuit
Indoor tennis tournaments
Sports competitions in Melbourne
Tennis in Victoria (Australia)
1980 establishments in Australia
1985 disestablishments in Australia
Recurring sporting events established in 1980
Recurring events disestablished in 1985